David Austin (born 1967) is a New Zealand-based actor.

Biography
austin's family moved to New Zealand when he was 8 months old and settled in the Auckland suburb of Manurewa. He left school at 15, serving an apprenticeship in Fitting at the Otahuhu Railway Workshops. During the nineties David worked in various jobs, including shoe repair, carpentry and anodising. In 2004, Austin quit full-time work to study Multimedia at SAE Institute in Auckland and set up his own web design business the following year. In 2007, he took up acting, becoming the frightening face of New Zealand road safety in a series of ads on intersections and in 2009 played Medicus in the Starz series Spartacus: Blood and Sand.

References

External links
 Official Website
 
 LTNZ "Spin the wheel" advertisement

New Zealand male film actors
Living people
1967 births
People from Manurewa
New Zealand male television actors